The Rhythm of Love Tour was the third concert tour by Kylie Minogue, in support of her third studio album Rhythm of Love (1990). Beginning on 10 February 1991, the tour visited Australia and East Asia.

The concerts showcased a more confident Minogue as she began to command control over her image, as well as new songs from the album Rhythm of Love, which offered a then new sound for the Australian pop star. Costumes for the shows, with exception of the opening outfit (a Rigby Peller basque and PVC shorts) were designed by the same team as Kylie's previous two tours and marked the final time she would engage their services.

Planned VHS release for the show, recorded in Sydney Australia was cancelled in favour of an updated version of the tour following its extension into Europe in late 1991. By then, it had become known as the Let's Get to It Tour in support of a new studio album of the same name, with new wardrobe, modified set list and a much more live assured Minogue.

Setlist 
 "Step Back in Time"
 "Wouldn't Change a Thing"
 "Got to Be Certain"
 "Always Find The Time"
 "Enjoy Yourself"
 "Tears on My Pillow"
 "Secrets"
 "Help!"
 "I Should Be So Lucky"
 "What Do I Have to Do?"
 "Je Ne Sais Pas Pourquoi"
 "One Boy Girl"
 "Love Train"
 "Rhythm of Love"
 "Shocked"
Encore
 "Hand on Your Heart"
 "Count the Days"
 "The Loco-Motion"
 "Better the Devil You Know"

Tour dates

Personnel

 Kylie Minogue – producer, concept
 Terry Blamey – administration
 Adrian Scott – musical director
 Nick Pitts – tour manager
 Henry Crallam – production manager
 Clive Franks – sound manager
 Jonathon Smeeton – lighting director
 Venol John – choreographer, dancer
 Yvonne Savage – assistant
 Carol Minogue – wardrobe supervisor
 Adrian Scott – keyboards
 John Creech – drums
 Jamie Jardine – guitar
 Craig Newman – bass
 Tania Smith – keyboards
 Gerry Ciavarella – saxophone
 Nicki Nicholls – backing vocals
 Deni Hines – backing vocals
 James Uluave – backing vocals
 Richard Allen – dancer
 Cosima Dusting – dancer
 Simone Kay – dancer
 Mitchell Bartlett – dancer

Notes
 The Rhythm of Love Tour was recorded in Sydney, at the final show of the Australian leg. The footage remains unreleased. The photo stills of this recording appeared on the internet in January 2014. On 6 August 2015 a short montage of "Step Back in Time", dance sequence of "Shocked" and the full performance of "Count The Days" appeared on YouTube. The full concert footage remains unreleased.
 In commemoration of the tour, a special edition of Rhythm of Love was released in Australia, including remixed versions of the songs "Better the Devil You Know", "Step Back in Time", and "What Do I Have To Do" as bonus tracks. The album came in a normal CD Case with a gold slip cover
 A poor quality audio recording exists of the full 15 February 1991 Adelaide show on SoundCloud

External links and references

 "1991 Rhythm of Love Tour"
 Kylie Minogue notable Tours-Part 2-Rhythm of Love Tour
 Rhythm of Love Tour 1991
 RHYTHM OF LOVE TOUR 1991

Kylie Minogue concert tours
1991 concert tours